Lover's Grief over the Yellow River is a 1999 Chinese film directed by Feng Xiaoning. It was China's official Best Foreign Language Film submission at the 72nd Academy Awards, but did not receive a nomination. Feng considers it the second of his  "War and Peace" (战争与和平) trilogy.

Plot
The plot centers on an American pilot, played by Paul Kersey, who also starred in Feng Xiaoning's 1997 Red River Valley, a film which depicted the British invasion of Tibet in 1905. During the Second Sino-Japanese War the American pilot makes a forced landing near the Great Wall in North China but is taken into the care of the Communist guerilla forces. He meets and falls in love with a young woman fighter who had been raped by the Japanese invaders. The American returns to the Yellow River after the opening of China in the 1980s.

See also
 List of submissions to the 72nd Academy Awards for Best Foreign Language Film
 List of Chinese submissions for the Academy Award for Best Foreign Language Film

References

External links

Lover's Grief over the Yellow River at the Chinese Movie Database (under the title Love Story by the Yellow River)

1990s Mandarin-language films
Second Sino-Japanese War films
1999 films
1990s war drama films
Chinese war drama films
Films directed by Feng Xiaoning
1990s war films
1999 drama films